Etterlin is a surname. Notable people with the surname include:

Egloff Etterlin (c. 1400–c. 1470), Swiss diplomat and economist
Ferdinand Maria von Senger und Etterlin (1923–1987), German Bundeswehr general
Fridolin von Senger und Etterlin (1891–1963), German General in the Wehrmacht during World War II.
Petermann Etterlin (c. 1430/40–c. 1509), Swiss historian and writer

References